Henry Egan (23 February 1912 — 1979) was an English professional footballer who played as a forward.

Career
Egan began his career with Sutton Town before joining Football League side Brighton & Hove Albion. Unable to establish himself in the first team, he moved on to Southend United for a brief spell. He joined Aldershot in 1937, finishing as the club's top scorer for the 1937–38 season.

The following season, he played against Cardiff City where his performance prompted Cardiff manager Billy Jennings to sign him for a fee of £1,500. He scored on his debut for the club, during a 1–1 draw with Exeter City, and scored a further eight league goals before his professional career was brought to an end by the outbreak of World War II.

Personal life
Egan's father William Egan was also a professional footballer and won a single cap for Wales in 1892. His brother Doug also played in the Football League for Derby County and Aldershot.

References

1912 births
1979 deaths
English footballers
Ashfield United F.C. players
Brighton & Hove Albion F.C. players
Southend United F.C. players
Aldershot F.C. players
Cardiff City F.C. players
English Football League players
Association football forwards